Linda Stewart Dalianis (born October 1, 1948) is the former Chief Justice of the New Hampshire Supreme Court and the first woman to serve on that court.

Background
Linda Stewart Dalianis is a 1974 graduate of Suffolk University Law School in Boston where she received her Juris Doctor degree. Prior to attending Suffolk Law, she graduated from Villa Augustina School in 1966 and Northeastern University in 1970. After graduation from Suffolk, Dalianis worked in private practice in Nashua until 1979 when she became marital master of the Superior Court. Dalianis became the first woman appointed to the New Hampshire Superior Court in 1980, the first female chief justice of the Superior Court in 2000 and then the first female Supreme Court justice also in 2000. In December 2010 Dalianis was elevated to chief justice.

In November 2017, Dalianis announced she would retire from the court effective April 1, 2018, due to the mandatory retirement age of 70 years under the New Hampshire Constitution.

See also
List of female state supreme court justices
List of first women lawyers and judges in New Hampshire

References

1948 births
21st-century American judges
Chief Justices of the New Hampshire Supreme Court
Living people
Northeastern University alumni
Suffolk University Law School alumni
Women chief justices of state supreme courts in the United States
21st-century American women judges
American people of Greek descent
20th-century American women judges
20th-century American judges